Krombia pulchella is a moth in the family Crambidae. It was described by Hans Georg Amsel in 1949. It is found in Iran.

Subspecies
Krombia pulchella pulchella
Krombia pulchella farsella Amsel, 1961

References

Cybalomiinae
Moths described in 1949